Gordon Ramsay's 24 Hours to Hell and Back is an American reality television series that aired on Fox from June 13, 2018 to May 12, 2020.

Starring chef Gordon Ramsay, the show features his travels across the United States, visiting failing restaurants in his 70-foot-long "Hell On Wheels" semi-truck that unfolds into a high-tech mobile kitchen, where the chefs are retrained. At first, a team is sent in to secretly survey the restaurant, with Ramsay eventually going undercover inside. He then tries to address the issues and revive each restaurant by retraining staff and refreshing the menu, culminating in a relaunch of the restaurant with a grand re-opening to the public after extensive renovations—all in just 24 hours. The format is similar to those of other programs such as Hotel Hell, Kitchen Nightmares, and Restaurant: Impossible.

On June 27, 2018, Fox renewed Gordon Ramsay's 24 Hours to Hell and Back for a second season, which premiered on January 2, 2019. The show was later renewed for a third season on July 26, 2019, which premiered on January 7, 2020.

On March 4, 2020, it was announced that a 2-hour "Save Our Town" special episode would be airing on May 12, in which Ramsay helps three businesses in Ellicott City, Maryland following their 2016 and 2018 floods.

Episodes

Series overview

Season 1 (2018)

Season 2 (2019)

Season 3 (2020)

Special (2020)

Ratings

Season 1

Season 2

Season 3

References

External links
 
 

2018 American television series debuts
2020 American television series endings
2010s American reality television series
2020s American reality television series
English-language television shows
Food reality television series
Fox Broadcasting Company original programming
Television series by All3Media